Ashina Xian was a Western Turk khagan, also a general of Protectorate General to Pacify the West from 708 to 717, appointed by the Tang dynasty.

Life 
When his father was executed by Lai Junchen in 692, he was exiled to Yazhou. However, he was recalled to court in 703.

In 708, he was appointed Xingxiwang Khagan by Zhongzhong. However, Suoge was appointed as his subordinate, who was going to appointed Shisixing Khagan later.

In 714, after the death of Suoge in the Battle of Bolchu, Xian was created Qixi (碛西) Military Commissioner and sent to Suyab to fill in the power vacuum.

Nevertheless, when Suluk rose to prominence, the Tang appointed Ashina Xian as the Shixing Qaghan in 716 and appointed Suluk as his deputy, to appease Suluk. Suluk's growing ambition over Xian's overlordship resulted in war and defeat of Xian in June and July in 717.

After defeat he left for Changan and died sometime during the Kaiyuan era. His successor was his son Ashina Zhen.

References 

8th-century Turkic people
Ashina house of the Turkic Empire
Tang dynasty generals
Göktürk khagans